Kyle Thomas Busch (born May 2, 1985) is an American professional stock car racing driver and team owner. He competes full-time in the NASCAR Cup Series, driving the No. 8 Chevrolet Camaro ZL1 for Richard Childress Racing, part-time in the NASCAR Xfinity Series, driving the No. 10 Chevrolet Camaro for Kaulig Racing, and part-time in the NASCAR Craftsman Truck Series, driving the No. 51 Chevrolet Silverado for Kyle Busch Motorsports. KBM runs multiple trucks in the Truck Series. Busch is the 2009 NASCAR Nationwide Series champion and the 2015 and 2019 Cup Series champion. Busch is currently 9th on the all-time NASCAR Cup Series wins list and his dominance of NASCAR's three major series has him ranked as one of the greatest racing drivers of all time. Busch is also a WWE 24/7 Champion.

Busch is the younger brother of 2004 NASCAR Nextel Cup Series champion Kurt Busch.

He is nicknamed "Rowdy" and "Wild Thing" for his driving style, "The Candy Man" due to his longtime sponsorship with Mars, Incorporated, "Shrub", as the younger brother of Kurt Busch and a small bush being called a shrub and the self-titled "KFB".

Early life and career
Busch was born in Las Vegas, Nevada. His first driving lessons came at the age of six when he drove around the cul-de-sac of his family's Las Vegas neighborhood in a makeshift go-kart. Although he could not reach the throttle, Busch still was able to pick up the basics from his father Tom, who controlled the gas pedal as Busch drove the vehicle. Busch worked in the family garage with his father and older brother Kurt as he grew, becoming crew chief for his brother's dwarf car team at age ten.

Busch began his driving career in 1998, shortly after his 13th birthday; from 1999 through 2001, Busch won over 65 races in legends car racing, winning two track championships at the Las Vegas Motor Speedway Bullring short-track, before moving to late models; Busch scored ten victories in late model competition at the Bullring during the 2001 season.

At the age of 16, Busch began competing in the NASCAR Craftsman Truck Series, driving the No. 99 Ford for Roush Racing as a replacement for Nathan Haseleu, who was released midway in the 2001 season. He made his debut at Indianapolis Raceway Park, posting a 9th-place finish in his first race in the series. In his second race at Chicago Motor Speedway, he was leading until his truck ran out of fuel with 12 laps to go.

Busch was the fastest in practice for the 2001 Auto Club 200 at California Speedway in Fontana, CA, when he was informed he was not allowed to participate in events at the track, due to the fact that the CART FedEx Championship Series, running at the track the same weekend had its race sponsored by Marlboro cigarettes. Busch was decreed ineligible to compete due an interpretation of the Master Settlement Agreement of 1998, prohibiting people under 18 years of age in participating in events sponsored by tobacco companies; Tim Woods III replaced Busch in the No. 99 Ford for the event and finished 25th. Busch competed in a total of six races in the Truck Series in 2001, finishing ninth twice, at IRP and at Las Vegas Motor Speedway.

Six weeks after the Fontana incident, NASCAR imposed a minimum age of 18 years starting in 2002 to prevent incidents of the sort from happening again; this was partially because Winston was the series sponsor of its premier Winston Cup Series at the time. When the age requirements were put in place, Busch switched from NASCAR to the American Speed Association (ASA) National Tour, finishing 8th in points.

In 2002, Busch graduated a year early with honors from Durango High School in Las Vegas, Nevada to focus on his driving career. That same year, he made his debut in the ARCA RE/MAX Series at Lowe's Motor Speedway, finishing twelfth in the No. 22 Chevrolet for WP Motorsports.

NASCAR

Busch holds several records in NASCAR competition, including the most race wins in a season across the top three NASCAR series the modern era, with 24 wins, which he accomplished in 2010. He holds the record for most all-time wins in all three of NASCAR's national touring series with 223 (as of April 17, 2022). Furthermore, he holds the record for the most Xfinity Series wins in a season with 13 in 2010, and the most overall with 102. Busch also holds the record for most overall wins in the Truck Series with 61. As of 2022, he is the only driver in history to have 60 wins in each of NASCAR's top 3 series. At Dover on May 6, 2019, His 10th place finish tied the record of consecutive top-ten finishes to start a season by tying Morgan Shepherd with 11. With his win at Auto Club Speedway on February 26, 2023, Kyle is now the sole record holder for the most consecutive seasons with a win, as of 2023 it stands at 19.

At age 19 years and 317 days, Busch became NASCAR's youngest ever pole winner in a Cup Series race at California Speedway in 2005. He is the youngest driver to qualify for the Chase for the Sprint Cup, in 2006. Furthermore, Busch became the first driver to win a race and a championship in a Toyota in the Cup Series, winning at Atlanta Motor Speedway during the 2008 season and the 2015 Cup championship. Additionally, he is the only driver to win four straight spring races at Richmond International Raceway (2009–2012), and was also the inaugural winner of the first Cup Series race at Kentucky Speedway, in 2011.

Busch, who began his NASCAR career in 2003, is one of only six drivers who have won a championship in both the Cup Series and the Xfinity Series, and in 2005 became the 14th of only 36 drivers to win a race in each of NASCAR's three national series. In 2009, Busch became the first driver to win two of NASCAR's top touring series races in the same day (at Auto Club Speedway), followed in 2010 as the first driver to win races in all three of NASCAR's top three touring series in the same weekend (at Bristol), which he did again at the same track in 2017.

When Busch won the 2009 Crown Royal Presents the Russell Friedman 400 at Richmond International Raceway as he turned 24, he was the second of just three people to ever win on their birthday. Twelve years later, on his 36th birthday, he won the Buschy McBusch Race 400 at Kansas Speedway. By winning for the second time on his birthday, he joined Cale Yarborough as the only two drivers to win on their birthday twice. In 2010, Kyle Busch Motorsports became the first Truck Series organization to win the owners' championship in its debut season after recording eight wins, 16 top fives, and 21 top-ten finishes in 2010.

As of completion of the 2022 Daytona 500, Busch holds the record for most lifetime laps led in that race324 lapswithout winning it.

In December 2021, it was announced that M&M/Mars was leaving Busch and Joe Gibbs Racing as primary sponsor at the end of the 2022 season. On September 13, 2022, Busch announced he signed a multi-year contract with Richard Childress Racing starting in 2023.

Late model racing

Busch has maintained an active schedule of regional late model stock car racing, running his own Kyle Busch Motorsports cars in various events. His biggest win came in December 2009 when he won the 42nd running of the Snowball Derby at Five Flags Speedway in Pensacola, Florida. Busch won the Snowball Derby again in December 2017.

On July 10, 2011, Busch won the 32nd annual Slinger Nationals at Slinger Speedway in Wisconsin. Two weeks later, Busch won the 38th annual TD Bank 250 presented by New England Dodge Dealers at Oxford Plains Speedway; it was his third attempt to win the event. Busch became only the second active NASCAR Sprint Cup Series driver to win the event, New England's largest short track race, joining Kevin Harvick as the only other active Sprint Cup driver to win the race with his victory in 2008. Busch stated "I've had this one on my list of big races that I wanted to win and now that I've done it, it feels great - it was everything I thought it would be." Busch also won the preliminary Pro All Star Series Oxford 150 the previous night, sweeping the weekend's events.

Busch won the eighth annual Prelude to the Dream at Eldora Speedway in June 2012, beating Tony Stewart to win the pay-per-view all-star event.

In July 2013, Busch won the second running of the Howie Lettow Memorial 150 at the Milwaukee Mile, beating defending race winner Travis Sauter and NASCAR Truck Series regular Johnny Sauter to win the darkness-shortened 43-car event, having led every practice session and setting fast time in qualifying.

Other racing
Busch was one of several American drivers under consideration to drive for the US-based Formula One team US F1. Busch declined the offer, stating that the timing was wrong; the team folded due to economic issues without ever competing in a race. Busch was scheduled to test drive a Toyota F1 car at the end of the 2008 racing season, but was forced to cancel the test due to his commitment to attend the 2008 Nationwide Series banquet.

In 2020, Busch ran the 24 Hours of Daytona for AIM Vasser-Sullivan, driving a Lexus RC F GT3 alongside Jack Hawksworth, Parker Chase, and Michael De Quesada. Busch drove for four-and-a-half hours as his team finished 26th overall and ninth in the GTD class.

Nitro Rallycross, a rallycross series founded by former NASCAR driver Travis Pastrana, invited Busch to run the November 2021 race weekend at Wild Horse Pass Motorsports Park. Busch finished 4th in the Supercar Final, with Pastrana winning the race.

Charity efforts
In 2006, Busch founded the Kyle Busch Foundation following a visit to the St. John's Home in Grand Rapids, Michigan. According to the Foundation, "The Kyle Busch Foundation is dedicated to providing essential tools for less fortunate children throughout the country.". Busch also has personal sponsorship deals in place with Monster Energy and Electric Visual, with both appearing on his late model at one time or another.

During the 2008 season, Busch announced the "Kyle's Miles" program in association with Pedigree to help dogs in shelters and breed rescue organizations.

After Busch's first Cup Series win at California on September 4, 2005, he and car owner Rick Hendrick donated their winning shares from that race to the American Red Cross to help benefit those in need after Hurricane Katrina. Because of this, Busch had an appearance on The Oprah Winfrey Show, which during the interview he announced the donations, which gained huge public attention and praise.

Personal life
 Kyle Busch married Samantha Sarcinella on December 31, 2010, in Chicago, which was featured in an hour special on Style Network. Sarcinella is a native of St. John, Indiana, and a graduate of Purdue University with a psychology degree. Their son, Brexton Locke Busch, was born on May 18, 2015. The couple welcomed a daughter, Lennix Key Busch, on  May 10, 2022.

He is often nicknamed "Shrub", as the younger brother of Kurt Busch, a small bush being called a shrub. Busch also uses the nickname "Rowdy", after Days of Thunder character Rowdy Burns.

Legal issues
On May 24, 2011, Busch was cited for reckless driving and speeding near Troutman, North Carolina, driving  in a  speed limit zone. He issued a public apology in which he stated he got "carried away" test driving a Lexus LFA. On August 23, 2011, he received a $1,000 fine and had his license suspended for 45 days after he pleaded guilty to speeding. He was also ordered to serve 30 hours of community service and placed on one year of unsupervised probation. On April 29, 2014, Busch was cited for traveling  in a  speed limit zone on NC 73 in Denver, North Carolina. The officer claimed Busch had a "disrespectful attitude.

On February 6, 2023, news accounts indicated that in January, Busch had been arrested in Cancun, Mexico for possession of a handgun. The prosecutor indicated that Busch had been sentenced to 42 months in prison and a $1,100 fine, but offered no information about how Busch’s sentence would be served. Busch issued a statement apologizing for being unaware of the relevant Mexican laws, but indicated that he considered the matter closed.

In popular media
Busch is one of the cover drivers of NASCAR Kart Racing. He is also featured on the cover of NASCAR Heat 2 after winning the cover driver competition at the 2017 Monster Energy NASCAR All-Star Race.

Busch is featured as a playable driver in Forza Motorsport 6, via the NASCAR expansion pack. The expansion features twenty-four paint schemes from the 2016 Sprint Cup Series season, including Busch's No. 18 Camry with primary sponsorship from M&M's and Interstate Batteries. Busch, along with Chase Elliott and Jimmie Johnson, provide commentary in the expansion as the "voices of motorsport."

Busch had a cameo as a West Virginia state trooper in the 2017 film Logan Lucky.

In 2017, he appeared as a celebrity contestant on The $100,000 Pyramid.

As of August 2019, Busch and his wife star on CMT's Racing Wives reality TV show.

A professional wrestling fan, Busch has also appeared on WWE programming several times, including guest hosting Monday Night Raw in 2009, and 10 years later on the same program on December 2, 2019. During the latter appearance, he won the WWE 24/7 Championship, pinning R-Truth with fellow NASCAR personality Michael Waltrip as special guest referee; R-Truth reclaimed the title later in the show.  That event was part of a cross-promotion with NBC Sports with NASCAR's prize-giving banquet.

In 2022, an American documentary, Rowdy, was produced which focused on the NASCAR career of Kyle Busch. It was released on 29 June 2022.

Rowdy Energy

Rowdy Energy is a drink industry business based out of Del Mar, California that specializes in energy drinks. The business is co-owned by Busch, who founded it with beverage entrepreneur Jeff Church in 2019.

The drink is named after Busch's nickname "Rowdy". It was launched in 2019 by both Busch and Jeff Church, who had co-founded Suja Juice in 2012. In an interview with Autoweek, Busch said he created the drink, "Just to have a healthier option for the fans, for myself." According to the company's YouTube channel, the first run of drinks were produced in January 2020. The drinks are available online in ten flavors, including seven sugar free options that are Keto certified. The traditional drinks have 60 percent less sugar than other popular energy drink brands.

Rowdy branding was first spotted at a race track during Busch's 2020 24 Hours of Daytona performance when, in the opening hour, Busch was seen with a can of the Cherry Limeade flavor and wearing a Rowdy Energy branded hat. The logo also appeared on Busch's 2020 Daytona 500 helmet and he was seen drinking one of the beverages following his exit from the race. Rowdy Energy is listed as an associate partner on KyleBusch.com. Outside of NASCAR, Rowdy Energy became a sponsor of Formula Drift driver Ken Gushi in late 2020. The brand has also served as the naming rights for races such as the Southern Super Series' Rowdy Energy Twin 100s at Five Flags Speedway in July and sprint car racing's TRD KKBM Giveback Classic presented by Rowdy Energy in November. Rowdy Energy is also the sponsor for sprint and midget car driver Rico Abreu.

Motorsports career results

NASCAR
(key) (Bold – Pole position awarded by qualifying time. Italics – Pole position earned by points standings or practice time. * – Most laps led. ** – All laps led.)

Cup Series

Daytona 500

Xfinity Series

Craftsman Truck Series

Camping World East Series

 Season still in progress 
 Ineligible for series points

ARCA Re/Max Series
(key) (Bold – Pole position awarded by qualifying time. Italics – Pole position earned by points standings or practice time. * – Most laps led.)

Complete WeatherTech SportsCar Championship results
(key) (Races in bold indicate pole position; races in italics indicate fastest lap)

24 Hours of Daytona

Awards and honors
NASCAR
Two-time NASCAR Cup Series Champion (2015, 2019)
Two-time NASCAR Cup Series Regular Season Champion (2018, 2019)
2009 NASCAR Xfinity Series Champion
Seven-time NASCAR Camping World Truck Series Owner's Champion (as owner of Kyle Busch Motorsports - 2010, 2013, 2014, 2015, 2016, 2017, 2019)

WWE
WWE 24/7 Championship (1 time)

Media
Two-time Best Driver ESPY Award winner (2015, 2019)

See also

List of all-time NASCAR Cup Series winners
List of NASCAR Nationwide Series champions
List of NASCAR race wins by Kyle Busch
List of NASCAR Sprint Cup Series champions
List of people from Las Vegas

References
Notes

Citations

External links

 
 
 

 
1985 births
Living people
American company founders
American people of German descent
American Speed Association drivers
ARCA Menards Series drivers
ARCA Midwest Tour drivers
Celebrities who have won professional wrestling championships
Drink company founders
Hendrick Motorsports drivers
Joe Gibbs Racing drivers
Kyle Busch Motorsports drivers
NASCAR Cup Series champions
NASCAR Cup Series regular season champions
NASCAR drivers
NASCAR team owners
NASCAR Xfinity Series champions
Racing drivers from Las Vegas
Racing drivers from Nevada
Rolex Sports Car Series drivers
Sportspeople from Las Vegas
WWE 24/7 Champions
RFK Racing drivers
Chip Ganassi Racing drivers
WeatherTech SportsCar Championship drivers